Dracul is a 2018 prequel novel to Bram Stoker's classic 1897 work Dracula. The book was written by Bram Stoker's great-grandnephew Dacre Stoker and American author J. D. Barker. It is Stoker's second novel, after his 2009 Dracula sequel, Dracula the Un-dead.

In its preparation, Stoker and Barker referenced Bram Stoker's notes for Dracula, its manuscript, its Icelandic variant Makt Myrkranna, and the short story Dracula's Guest, while Stoker also visited the locations mentioned in the books and in Bram Stoker's diary. Dracul makes use of the unpublished first 100 pages of Dracula's manuscript. Primarily set in 1868, the novel places a 21-year-old Bram Stoker as its central character, as he journals the sequence of events that lead him to facing off with The Count, including Stoker's childhood.



Synopsis
From within Bran Castle, Bram writes in his diary about his childhood days, largely spent bedridden in Dublin, with his siblings, Matilda and Thornley, and nanny, Ellen Crone. The Stoker children become suspicious of Ellen following a series of deaths in nearby towns. After Bram is miraculously healed from his ailments, she suddenly disappears into a bog without a trace. Matilda later departs for Paris to study, and returns after some years to report that she has once again seen Ellen, albeit unaged. They set off to investigate Ellen, eventually revealing her connection to Dracula.

Reception
In contrast to the mixed reaction to Stoker's previous work, the Dracula sequel Dracula the Un-dead, the critical response to Dracul has been positive. Kirkus Reviews wrote that it "will no doubt be a hit among monster-movie and horror lit fans—and for good reason", noting that it is "a lively if unlovely story, in which the once febrile Bram becomes a sort of Indiana Jones".

For the Financial Times, Zoë Apostolides writes that the "interpretation of the Stokers' lives represents a thrilling new exploration of the novel's creation and its creator", and that "this addition to the canon is a brilliantly entertaining read".

Angie Barry, writing a mixed review for Criminal Element, says "Dracul doesn’t tread much new ground. But its biographical framing and focus on Ellen Crone makes it a compelling, entertaining read nonetheless".

Film
In September 2017, prior to Draculs publication, Paramount purchased the movie rights to the book. Director Andy Muschietti, It producers Barbara Muschietti and Roy Lee were announced to be attached to the film.

References

2018 American novels
American horror novels
Sequel novels
Prequel novels
Novels set in the 1910s
Dracula novels
Novels set in London
Cultural depictions of Vlad the Impaler
Cultural depictions of Elizabeth Báthory
American vampire novels
Collaborative novels
G. P. Putnam's Sons books